The women's slalom competition of the Sochi 2014 Olympics was held at the Rosa Khutor Alpine Resort near Krasnaya Polyana, Russia, on 21 February.

Results
The first run was held at 16:45 and the second run at 20:15.

References

Slalom